Euphorbia caput-aureum is a species of plant in the family Euphorbiaceae. It is endemic to Madagascar.  Its natural habitat is rocky areas.

References

Endemic flora of Madagascar
caput-aureum
Data deficient plants
Taxonomy articles created by Polbot